The amyrins are three closely related natural chemical compounds of the triterpene class.  They are designated α-amyrin (ursane skeleton), β-amyrin (oleanane skeleton)  and δ-amyrin. Each is a pentacyclic triterpenol with the chemical formula C30H50O. They are widely distributed in nature and have been isolated from a variety of plant sources such as epicuticular wax. In plant biosynthesis, α-amyrin is the precursor of ursolic acid and β-amyrin is the precursor of oleanolic acid. All three amyrins occur in the surface wax of tomato fruit. α-Amyrin is found in dandelion coffee.

A study demonstrated that α,β-amyrin exhibits long-lasting antinociceptive and anti-inflammatory properties in 2 models of persistent nociception via activation of the cannabinoid receptors CB1 and CB2 and by inhibiting the production of cytokines and expression of NF-κB, CREB and cyclooxygenase 2.

References 

Secondary alcohols
Triterpenes